Polycauliona is a genus of lichen-forming fungi in the family Teloschistaceae.

Species
Polycauliona antarctica 
Polycauliona ascendens 
Polycauliona austrogeorgica 
Polycauliona bolacina 
Polycauliona brattiae 
Polycauliona candelaria 
Polycauliona charcotii 
Polycauliona citrina 
Polycauliona comandorica  – Commander Islands
Polycauliona coralligera 
Polycauliona coralloides 
Polycauliona fruticulosa 
Polycauliona impolita 
Polycauliona inconspecta 
Polycauliona johnstonii 
Polycauliona kaernefeltii 
Polycauliona leechii 
Polycauliona luctuosa 
Polycauliona murrayi 
Polycauliona phryganitis 
Polycauliona pollinarioides 
Polycauliona polycarpa 
Polycauliona prostrata 
Polycauliona pulvinata 
Polycauliona regalis 
Polycauliona rhopaloides 
Polycauliona sparsa 
Polycauliona stellata 
Polycauliona tenax 
Polycauliona tenuiloba 
Polycauliona thamnodes 
Polycauliona theloschistoides 
Polycauliona ucrainica

References

Teloschistales
Lichen genera
Taxa described in 1908
Teloschistales genera